The Horologium-Reticulum Supercluster, is a massive supercluster spanning around 550 million light-years. It has a mass of around 1017 solar masses, similar to that of the Laniakea Supercluster, which houses the Milky Way. It is centered on coordinates right ascension  and declination , and spans an angular area of 12° × 12°.

The nearest part of the supercluster is 700 million light-years away from Earth, while the far end of it is 1.2 billion light-years. It is visible in the constellations Horologium and Eridanus. The Horologium Supercluster has about 5,000 galaxy groups (30,000 giant galaxies and 300,000 dwarf galaxies). It includes the galaxy cluster Abell 3266.

Gallery

See also
 Abell catalog
 Large scale structure of the universe
 List of Abell clusters
 List of superclusters
 List of largest galaxy superclusters

References

Horologium (constellation)
Eridanus (constellation)
 
Galaxy superclusters